Kauder is a surname of:

 Hugo Kauder (9 June 1888 – 22 July 1972), mid-20th-century Austrian composer
 Jan Kauder ( 1931–1990), Polish footballer
 Reinhold Kauder (born January 30, 1950), German slalom canoeist  
 Siegfried Kauder (born 1950), German politician (CDU)
 Volker Kauder (born 3 September 1949), German lawyer and politician (CDU)